The Fabelmans is a 2022 American coming-of-age drama film directed by Steven Spielberg, who co-wrote and produced it with Tony Kushner. The film is a semi-autobiographical story loosely based on Spielberg's adolescence and first years as a filmmaker. It's told through an original story of the fictional Sammy Fabelman, a young aspiring filmmaker who explores how the power of films can help him see the truth about his dysfunctional family and those around him. It stars Gabriel LaBelle as Sammy, alongside Michelle Williams, Paul Dano, Seth Rogen, and Judd Hirsch in supporting roles. The film is dedicated to the memories of Spielberg's real-life parents, Leah Adler and Arnold Spielberg, who died in 2017 and 2020 respectively.

Spielberg had conceived the project as early as 1999, with his sister Anne writing a screenplay titled I'll Be Home. The project was withheld for 20 years, since Spielberg had reservations about exploring his family's story over concerns that his parents would be hurt. Spielberg revisited the project in 2019 with screenwriter and frequent collaborator Kushner while they were making West Side Story, and the screenplay was completed in late 2020. Development of the film officially began soon after, with casting taking place between March and May 2021. Principal photography began that July in Los Angeles and wrapped in September.

The Fabelmans premiered at the Toronto International Film Festival on September 10, 2022, where it won the People's Choice Award. Distributed by Universal Pictures, the film opened as a limited theatrical release in the United States on November 11, 2022, and then expanded to a wide release on November 23. It underperformed at the box office compared to typical Spielberg projects, grossing only $40.8 million against a $40 million budget.

Nonetheless, the film received acclaim from critics and was named one of the top ten films of 2022 by the National Board of Review and the American Film Institute. It earned numerous awards and nominations including seven nominations at the 95th Academy Awards, including Best Picture, Best Director, Best Actress (Williams), and Best Supporting Actor (Hirsch). It also earned 11 nominations at the 28th Critics' Choice Awards and five at the 80th Golden Globe Awards, winning Best Motion Picture – Drama and Best Director.

Plot

On a January night in 1952, in Haddon Township, New Jersey, Jewish couple Mitzi and Burt Fabelman take their young son Sammy to see his first film: Cecil B. DeMille's The Greatest Show on Earth. Dazzled by a train scene, Sammy asks for a model set for Hanukkah, which he crashes late one night. 

Mitzi, understanding Sammy's intentions, allows him to shoot another crash scene using Burt's 8mm camera. Sammy soon begins filming regularly, sometimes involving his younger sisters Reggie, Natalie, and Lisa. Burt is offered a new job in Phoenix, Arizona, and he and the family move there in early 1957; at Mitzi's insistence, Burt's best friend and business partner Bennie Loewy goes too.

Years later, teenaged Sammy continues making films with his friends in the Boy Scouts, during which he begins utilizing post-production effects and subsequently earns a badge in photography. Later, the Fabelmans, including Bennie, take a camping trip with Sammy capturing footage of their vacation. 

Shortly afterwards, Mitzi's mother dies, leaving her especially distraught. Providing him with film editing equipment, Burt suggests Sammy turn the camping trip footage into a film to cheer Mitzi up. Sammy objects over the scheduling of his next film, but Burt, who sees his passion for film as simply a hobby, argues that the home movie is more important.

The next morning, the Fabelmans receive a surprise visit from Mitzi's uncle Boris, a former lion tamer and film worker. That night, he speaks with Sammy about compromising his family with art, telling him that both aspects will continue to be at odds with one another. After Boris leaves, Sammy begins editing the camping trip footage, during which he finds evidence of Mitzi and Bennie having an affair. 

After weeks of harsh treatment towards her and Bennie, Sammy and Mitzi get into a heated argument. In a fit of rage, she slaps him across the back, forcing a distraught Sammy to show her the compiled footage. He promises to keep their secret.

The following week, Burt receives another work promotion, requiring another move to Saratoga, California. To keep the marriage intact, Bennie stays in Phoenix, but not before gifting Sammy a new film camera. Sammy refuses the camera until Bennie lets him pay $35 for it. Despite purchasing the camera, Sammy announces he will never use it.

Soon after arriving in his new neighborhood and school, Sammy becomes targeted by students Logan and Chad, who levy anti-Semitic abuse toward him. He also begins dating the devoutly Christian Monica. While having dinner with the Fabelmans, she suggests that Sammy film their Ditch Day at the beach, something he considers and eventually accepts after Monica tells him her father owns a 16mm Arriflex camera that he would let him use.

After finally moving from a rental to their newly purchased home, Mitzi and Burt announce their divorce due to her extreme depression and his discovery of the affair. This leaves the family heartbroken.

At prom, Sammy declares his love for Monica and asks her to come with him to Hollywood after high school. Unable to throw away her own life's plans to attend Texas A&M University, she breaks up with him, leaving him despondent. 

The Ditch Day film is played in front of Sammy's peers to a rapturous response. It glorifies Logan and vilifies Chad. When Logan confronts Sammy, confused over his positive portrayal, they reach an understanding, cemented when Logan fights Chad off when he tries to attack Sammy. The next morning, Mitzi and Sammy talk about their future together; just as she cannot give up her love for Bennie, she tells Sammy not to give up his love for filmmaking.

The following year, Sammy is living with his father in Hollywood. He wants to drop out of college, but is unable to find work in filmmaking. Burt begrudgingly accepts his son's passion. After seeing a photograph of Mitzi and Bennie together, Burt tells Sammy to keep on his path if it makes him happy. Sammy finally receives an offer from CBS to work on Hogan's Heroes. 

Knowing he is more interested in filmmaking, show co-creator Bernard Fein invites Sammy to meet director John Ford, one of his greatest filmmaking influences. During their brief meeting, Ford offers Sammy some pointers on framing. Newly invigorated, Sammy walks through the studio backlot. The camera frames the horizon in the center, contrary to Ford's advice, then conspicuously tilts to place it at the bottom.

Cast

Production

Development

In 1999, Steven Spielberg said he had been thinking of directing a film about his childhood for some time. Titled I'll Be Home, the project was originally written by his sister Anne Spielberg. He explained, "My big fear is that my mom and dad won't like it and will think it's an insult and won't share my loving yet critical point of view about what it was like to grow up with them." In 2002, Spielberg said he was nervous about making I'll Be Home: "It's so close to my life and so close to my family — I prefer to make films that are more analogous. But a literal story about my family will take a lot of courage. I still think I make personal movies even if they do look like big commercial popcorn films." Spielberg later revealed in November 2022 that his parents had also been "nagging" him to make a film about their lives prior to their deaths. His mother died in 2017, and his father in August 2020.

Writing

In 2004, while working on Munich, Spielberg told screenwriter Tony Kushner his life story, with Kushner telling him in response: "Someday you're going to have to make a film about this." The 80–90 page plot outline for The Fabelmans was worked on in 2019 during filming of Spielberg's 2021 film version of West Side Story. Work on the screenplay for The Fabelmans began on October 2, 2020, during the lockdowns caused by the COVID-19 pandemic, and lasted for two months, ending in December 2020. Kushner reflected on the experience, saying, "We wrote three days a week, four hours a day, and we finished the script in two months: by leagues the fastest I've finished anything. It was a blast. I loved it." Spielberg, at that time, felt that the climate caused by the pandemic convinced him that the time was now right to make the film, saying, "I started seriously thinking, if I had to make one movie I haven't made yet, something that I really want to do on a very personally atomic level, what would that be? And there was only one story I really wanted to tell ... My life with my mom and dad taught me a lesson, which I hope this film in a small way imparts ... Which is, when does a young person in a family start to see his parents as human beings? In my case, because of what happened between the ages of 7 and 18, I started to appreciate my mom and dad not as parents but as real people." He gave drafts of the script to his sisters, Sue and Nancy, to ensure that their memories be included in the story and that the details in the film were portrayed as accurately as possible.

On the meaning behind the family name "Fabelman", Kushner (who came up with that name) said, "Spielberg means play-mountain; 'spieler' is an actor in Yiddish, and a 'spiel' can be speech or can be a play ... I wanted to have some of that meaning, and I've always liked the German word 'fabel,' which means fable. And because the movie is autobiographical for Steven but it isn't an autobiography, it's not a documentary, so there's a fictional element as well. So I thought that 'Fabelman' was a nod to that."

Pre-production
In March 2021, Spielberg was announced to direct the film, with his involvement as co-screenwriter marking his first writing venture on a film since A.I. Artificial Intelligence (2001); it was also reported that Kristie Macosko Krieger would produce the film with Kushner and Spielberg. In March 2022, cinematographer Janusz Kamiński said the film would chronicle Spielberg's life from age seven to eighteen and deal with "his family, with his parents, conundrums with his sisters, but primarily deals with his passion for movie-making," while adding that it will touch on the themes of "young love, parental divorce, and early formative relationships ... It's a very beautiful, beautiful personal movie. It's very revealing about Steven's life and who he is as a filmmaker." In September 2022, Spielberg expressed how personal the film was to him, saying that "This film is, for me, a way of bringing my mom and dad back. And it also brought my sisters, Annie, Susie, and Nancy, closer to me than I ever thought possible. And that was worth making the film."

Casting

In casting the film, Spielberg explained that "Part of it had to be organic, and it had to be authentic to me. It wasn't really about anything beyond who can I have the most profound connection with and that reminds me the most of the people that brought me into the world and raised me and gave me good values." In March 2021, Michelle Williams was in negotiations to star as Mitzi Fabelman, the role inspired by Spielberg's mother Leah Adler, but with "an original voice". Spielberg himself had her in mind for the role after watching her performances in Blue Valentine (2010) and Fosse/Verdon (2019). That same month, it was reported that Seth Rogen joined the cast to play Bennie Loewy, the role inspired by Bernie Adler, "the favorite uncle of young Spielberg", while Williams was confirmed to have been cast. On April 8, 2021, Paul Dano joined the cast as Burt Fabelman, the role inspired by Spielberg's father Arnold. Dano admitted that he felt intimidated by playing the role because "the stakes felt really high ... You're embodying one of the most important, influential, complicated figures in [Spielberg's] life. It was incredible to see how much of this was in his work the whole time. He's sharing a piece of himself that I find very moving. There's a real gift in it, when somebody of that stature and at that level of artistry is willing to do that."

In May 2021, after a three-month search and over 2,000 contenders, Gabriel LaBelle entered final negotiations to portray the lead role, Sammy Fabelman, a young aspiring filmmaker based on Spielberg himself. He would be confirmed the next month in addition to the casting of Julia Butters as Reggie Fabelman, the role inspired by Spielberg's sister Anne. Later that June, Sam Rechner was cast as well. In July, Chloe East, Oakes Fegley, Isabelle Kusman, Jeannie Berlin, Judd Hirsch, Robin Bartlett and Jonathan Hadary were added to the cast, the latter of whom ultimately having his scenes cut from the final film. In August, Gabriel Bateman, Nicolas Cantu, Gustavo Escobar, Lane Factor, Cooper Dodson and Stephen Matthew Smith were cast. They were later followed by newcomers Keeley Karsten, Birdie Borria, Alina Brace, Sophia Kopera, and Mateo Zoryan Francis-DeFord. In February 2022, it was announced David Lynch would also star in a then-undisclosed role, later revealed to be that of film director John Ford. During the Q&A at an Academy Award-qualifying screening for the film on November 7, 2022, Spielberg revealed that it took three weeks to convince Lynch to be a part of the film, with Tony Kushner's husband Mark Harris taking credit for suggesting Lynch to Spielberg, and Laura Dern calling Lynch numerous times to get him to commit. In response, Lynch said he would take it as long as there were bags of Cheetos on set as refreshments. He also requested that he be given his costume as Ford a week before filming his scene to break it in.

In September 2022, during the film's world premiere, LaBelle revealed that he initially did not win the part of Sammy following his first audition but did upon receiving a callback three months afterward. On finally reading the script and learning the details about his character being a fictionalized version of Spielberg himself as a teenager for mostly the entire film, he recalled "When I was auditioning, the character's name was Teenage Sammy – I thought as opposed to Adult Sammy ... I get the script and you're reading it for 30 pages and he's 6 and 8 years old. Page 35 or so Teenage Sammy comes along. OK, good! Now this is my part. It's going to be a three-act movie, it's going to be a Moonlight or something. I kept waiting for my exit but it never came." Spielberg himself revealed that the role of Sammy was the hardest to cast, saying "As a kid growing up, I always had a lot of reasons why I was always in the corner, why I was always not the center of conversation ... I needed someone who wasn't going to bring too much self-awareness to Sammy." Upon casting LaBelle, casting director Cindy Tolan said "With Gabe, there was a poignancy. He could convey the pathos that was needed and also the humor," while Spielberg added, "I wasn't looking for what I see in the mirror, I was looking for a young actor who could carry a lot of story by being curious and honest and engaging and unpredictable."

Filming
Principal photography began in the midst of the COVID-19 pandemic in Los Angeles on July 17, 2021, lasting for 59 days until ending on September 27, 2021.

During the shoot, the cast gained access to home movies, photographs and recollections from Spielberg's family's past to learn what they were like and how to portray the fictionalized versions of them (the Fabelman family) on screen, while making them feel fresh and original. Paul Dano reflected "It was overwhelming and it was sort of a heavy cloak to bear because we were with someone who was having a big experience everyday, revisiting and reworking through a part of their life ... For somebody like Steven to share that much of himself with us – with the audience too – it was really a profound experience." In addition, Dano ordered and built a crystal radio set to get the feeling of how Arnold Spielberg was around electronics. Seth Rogen described the experience as "emotional" and recalled that Spielberg was "...crying a lot on set ... As we were shooting, I'd be like, 'Did this happen in real life?' and the answer was 'yes' a hundred percent of the time." Gabriel LaBelle also rewatched some of Spielberg's films, such as Empire of the Sun (1987) and constantly had conversations with Spielberg to learn more about his life in order to prepare for playing Sammy. The jewelry that Michelle Williams wore as part of the costumes for Mitzi Fabelman were in fact some of Leah Adler's, including a charm bracelet that had pictures of all four of her children. According to an interview she did for the Hollywood Insider at the TIFF premiere, Julia Butters was gifted with Anne Spielberg's high school ring to wear while she played Reggie Fabelman.

For the scenes of Sammy filming his own 8mm films, Spielberg decided to have the character recreate the exact ones he made during his childhood, and worked with Kamiński to ensure that they were portrayed as accurately as possible, but with improvements in the camera angles. Spielberg remarked "It was joyful being able to recreate those films ... I shot a lot of films when I was a kid on 8mm. It was unique in those days. Not a lot of people were going out and shooting in 8mm. It was physical; it was a craft. You had to sit there with a…splicer, and then you had to scrape the emulsion off the film in order to get a seal so when you put glue on it, you literally glued the film together. And I must say, I miss it." Gabriel LaBelle's first two days on set involved a scene where Sammy and his friends film a recreation of Spielberg's World War II short film Escape to Nowhere (1961). On the experience, LaBelle remarked "It was a cool way to see how Steven walked and moved around back then ... I asked so many questions about Saving Private Ryan, because we were doing a war film. For the first two days, it was me, Steven, Tony, and Janusz, just hanging out. Mitch Dubin, the A-camera operator, stormed the beaches of Normandy with a handheld camera for Saving Private Ryan – and now he's making this movie!" The 8mm and 16mm camera props used in the film had real film inside them, with LaBelle being taught how to use the cameras so that what was shot with them on set can be developed for usage in the film, as well as how to cut and splice film stock using the editing machines and film projectors of the time period. LaBelle also got to keep the 8mm camera Sammy used to film the family camping trip and Escape to Nowhere short film as a souvenir after the completion of principal photography. To look the part of Sammy and make the character look almost similar to Spielberg's teenage appearance, LaBelle had his hair straightened and changed the way he stood and walked, as well as retrained his muscles to mimic Spielberg's smile.

LaBelle was unaware of the casting of David Lynch as John Ford until the day the scene he had to do with him was filmed. He recalled that once Lynch came onto the set, it enabled him to embody Sammy and how he was feeling, recalling "[Lynch is] a great guy. But leading up to it, Sammy's nervous, so I'm getting nervous." The scene itself was written to historically match how the actual real-life encounter between Spielberg and Ford went down, with the latter's dialogue written exactly word-for-word, most notably Ford's advice to Sammy about framing: "When the horizon's at the bottom, it's interesting. When the horizon's at the top, it's interesting. When the horizon's in the middle, it's boring as shit!" The scene itself received acclaim by critics and audiences and won the award for Best Scene at the 2022 St. Louis Gateway Film Critics Association Awards. The last shot of the film, where the camera breaks the fourth wall and re-frames the horizon on the image of Sammy walking on the studio lot, was already in the script prior to filming. Drew Taylor of TheWrap named it the best final shot of the year, saying that it leaves the movie on "such a happy, hopeful note" and it metaphorically represents Spielberg's "admission that he might be the most revered filmmaker in the history of the medium, but he still screws up and he’s still got plenty to learn. The master is still a student. It’s easy to forget what John Ford yelled at you all those years ago." Matthew Jacobs of The Hollywood Reporter also called the moment one of the best closing shots of Spielberg's career. The film's iconic shot of Mateo Zoryan Francis-DeFord as young Sammy projecting his first 8mm film onto his hands was not initially planned until during pre-production when "Spielberg happened to project something on his hand while they were watching old home movies." Upon witnessing this, Kaminski knew it had to be incorporated, calling it a visual "metaphor of the entire movie: [Sammy] can have the image in his hand and shape it."

Judd Hirsch's couple of days on set involved filming a major monologue that his character Uncle Boris, inspired by Spielberg's real granduncle of the same name, gives to Sammy to inspire him to continue pursuing his ambitions while also warning him of the consequences that come with it. Hirsch compared his character to "a seer from Greek mythology, a soothsayer used by the gods to communicate with mortals." On acting alongside Gabriel LaBelle for the scene, he told Vanity Fair in November 2022 that on set "When I looked at it [the script] and I met Gabriel, I said, I'm gonna destroy this boy ... My part is to tell him that horrible things are gonna happen to him—even though it has to happen. So I walked out of there and I said, Who the hell am I...some oracle? You know, an oracle comes and stands in his room and takes him apart and tells him he has to be a director." Hirsch's performance and the monologue itself were met with acclaim from critics and viewers, which resulted in a huge round of applause from the audience during the TIFF world premiere.

Production design
To recreate the three houses that Spielberg lived in during his childhood in Haddon Township, New Jersey, Phoenix, Arizona, and Saratoga, California, production designer Rick Carter worked off floor plans that the director sketched from memory and then took artistic license with the spaces to fit the emotional mindset of Sammy. More attention was paid to the set in Phoenix, "...because, as a filmmaker, he became more himself. So not only the equipment that was there is accurate, but all the storyboards that Sammy used to make his movies. And Steven drew all the storyboards, and he still draws his storyboards the way he did as a teenager." Carter and set decorator Karen O'Hara also worked off photos and memories that Spielberg and his three sisters provided. All of the house interiors were built on soundstages. Carter also noted that the differences between the two houses had to do with he and his team having "the most pictures and home movies of the Phoenix house. The New Jersey [house] we had less, but we knew the rough plan and had a couple photos that at least indicated the tone of the paint color. It’s not an exact recreation, but the Phoenix house was especially close. My attempt the whole time was to have him to be able walk in and feel like he was close to being back."

The Los Gatos rental house that the family moved to in California was entirely fictional, as the Spielberg family actually lived in various rental apartments and temporary homes. According to Carter, the house in the film "served the function of the script to have them be in this one place they were moving into while waiting for this other house to get made. He’s moving to the promised land, but it doesn’t turn out to be so promised in California. In the beginning, it’s actually rainy and dark and gloomy, and all the kids at the school are a third bigger than he is.” 

For John Ford's office at the end of the film, Carter and his team used the director's 1957 film The Wings of Eagles as a direct reference, which features Ward Bond playing a character inspired by Ford. “It’s a much more elaborate office than the one we did, but we still got some of the sensibility from those images,” Carter said. “We were able to take that and say, ‘Let’s now take the elements that are important—the Western-style furniture and the Academy Awards but, more specifically, these sort of [Frederic] Remington-esque paintings.’ Some of them really are Remingtons. We got the rights to them and they have literally those horizons the way they are. But to really make the point of the low horizon, we painted a picture that is actually from a still frame of The Searchers to make it very, very clear that this is low horizon, this is high horizon. Then, he can make his point about, ‘Those are interesting.’ What I think everybody enjoyed about that was that it was such an emotional movie up to that point, and then you have somebody who takes all that emotion and reduces it to just ‘Do a good shot.’ I think that there’s a kind of a release. If you want [the emotion] to be dramatic, you have to make the image dramatic, and that’s what Steven Spielberg has become a master at over his lifetime.”

Music

The score was composed and conducted by John Williams, marking his 29th film collaboration with Spielberg and approaching the 50th anniversary of their first film The Sugarland Express, released in 1974.  On June 23, 2022, Williams revealed that this and Indiana Jones and the Dial of Destiny may be the last two films he will score before retirement. Recording of the score began in March 2022, following Williams's concert performance with the Vienna Philharmonic at Vienna's Musikverein. In July, stills from the recording sessions were revealed by one of the film's crew members, revealing that scoring of the film is underway. Along with his usual orchestral style, Williams opted for a score mostly relying on piano, with Joanne Pearce Martin, principal pianist of the Los Angeles Philharmonic, providing the piano solos. The film also features source classical music selected by Spielberg himself, some of which are performed on piano in the film by the character of Mitzi Fabelman, from composers such as Friedrich Kuhlau, Eric Satie, Muzio Clementi, Johann Sebastian Bach and Joseph Haydn. The film's soundtrack was released digitally by Sony Classical on November 11, 2022, and was released on physical CD on December 9, 2022. The film also features pop songs of the film's time period which are not featured on the soundtrack album, such as "Walk On By" by Dionne Warwick and "Goodbye Cruel World" by James Darren, the latter of which being used to accompany the montage sequence of Sammy Fabelman documenting his high school's Ditch Day on film.

Release
The Fabelmans was sneak previewed on July 26, 2022, in Nanuet, New York. It had its world premiere at the Princess of Wales Theatre during the Toronto International Film Festival on September 10, 2022, where it received two standing ovations from the audience, one before the film when Spielberg took the stage to introduce it, and a longer one preceding the post-film Q&A. The crowd was also reported to have been loudly chanting Spielberg's name while outside waiting to get into the theater during the red carpet arrivals. On the announcement of the premiere, TIFF CEO Cameron Bailey remarked: "It's different from a typical Spielberg blockbuster, but it is just as easily impactful in terms of the emotional effect it's going to have on people. If you love movies, this is going to be a very powerful film for you to watch. I'm excited that it's launching in an environment that celebrates cinema." Upon winning the festival's People's Choice Award, Spielberg remarked "I'm glad I brought this film to Toronto! This is the most personal film I've ever made, and the warm reception from everyone in Toronto made my first visit to TIFF so intimate and personal for me and my entire Fabelman family ... a very special thank you to all the movie fans in Toronto who have made this past weekend one I'll never forget." For his performance, Gabriel LaBelle was also named a 2022 TIFF Rising Star.

It held its European premiere at the Rome Film Festival on October 19, 2022, which was followed by its United States premiere at the TCL Chinese Theatre in Los Angeles on November 6, 2022, as the closing night film of the 2022 AFI Fest. It also closed the Miami International Film Festival on November 10, 2022, with Paul Dano virtually receiving the festival's Precious Gem Award. The French premiere took place at the Lumière Film Festival on October 18, 2022. It also screened as the opening night film of the 20th Morelia International Film Festival on October 23, 2022, the 63rd Thessaloniki International Film Festival on November 3, 2022, and the 44th Cairo International Film Festival on November 13, 2022. It also opened the 15th edition of "The Contenders" film series at the Museum of Modern Art in New York City on November 10, 2022, followed by a conversation with the cast.

It held its German premiere at the 73rd Berlin International Film Festival on February 21, 2023 as part of the Homage section (where Spielberg's other films Bridge of Spies (2015), Duel (1971), E.T. the Extra-Terrestrial (1982), Jaws (1975), Munich (2005), Raiders of the Lost Ark (1981) and Schindler's List (1993) were also screened) and at the awards ceremony, where Spielberg received an honorary Golden Bear for lifetime achievement. On the announcement, festival directors Mariette Rissenbeek and Carlo Chatrian remarked: "With an incredible career, Steven Spielberg has not only enchanted generations of viewers all over the world, but has also given a new meaning to the 'cinema' as the factory of dreams ... Be it in the everlasting magic world of teenagers or in the reality that history has carved forever, his movies take us to a different level, where the big screen becomes the adequate surface for our emotions to be fulfilled. If Berlinale 2023 represents a new beginning we couldn't find a better start than the one offered by Spielberg's great work."

Theatrical
The Fabelmans was released by Universal Pictures in select theaters in Los Angeles and New York City on November 11, 2022, with a nationwide release on November 23 in the United States. It became Spielberg's first film to be distributed by Universal since Munich (2005). Universal also distributed the film in some international territories, but as part of Amblin Partners' deal with Mister Smith Entertainment, there are some exceptions, as the film has been sold to Entertainment One for the United Kingdom, StudioCanal for Australia, WW Entertainment for Benelux, Leone Film Group for Italy, Reliance Distribution for India and Nordisk Film for Scandinavia.

Home media
The Fabelmans was released on VOD on December 13, 2022, and on digital January 17, 2023. It was released on DVD, Blu-ray and Ultra HD Blu-ray on February 14, 2023, by Universal Pictures Home Entertainment.

Marketing
The poster to promote the film's world premiere at TIFF was released on September 7, 2022, with the official theatrical release version of it being released on September 29, 2022. The trailer premiered online on September 11, 2022. The music for the trailer was composed by Felix Erskine of Cavalry Music. Universal spent approximately $8.5 million on the film's advertising campaign. Another trailer, set to Ben Folds' cover of The Beatles song "Golden Slumbers," was released on December 13, 2022.

Reception

Box office
, The Fabelmans has grossed $17.3 million in the United States and Canada, and $23.5 million in other territories, for a worldwide gross of $40.8 million.

In the United States, the film made $161,579 from four theaters in its opening weekend for an average of $40,395 per-screen, the third highest average for a Fall 2022 platform release, behind Till and The Banshees of Inisherin. The film expanded alongside Glass Onion: A Knives Out Mystery, Strange World, Devotion, and the wide expansion of Bones and All, and was projected to gross around $3–5 million from 638 theaters over the five-day weekend. Variety called the projections "a disappointing result for a $40 million movie, especially one that hails from the most successful director of his time" and compared the situation to the poor $38 million domestic box office returns of Spielberg's West Side Story the year before.

It made $400,000 on its first day of wide release, with an additional $480,000 on Thanksgiving Day and $880,000 on Black Friday, resulting in a 5-day weekend total of $3.4 million.
After four weeks in theaters, Spielberg's film grossed $6 million domestic, making it the worst financial performance ever for a Spielberg film, with the general public's trending lack of interest in prestige films, a muted reception from older audience demographics and the large decline in popularity and relevance of Spielberg and his filmography cited as the reasons. The film crossed the $10 million mark worldwide during Christmas weekend.  It performed better in the United Kingdom, grossing $1.3 million on its opening weekend, finishing fourth. It was also a success in France, grossing $2.2 million on its opening weekend, also finishing fourth.

Critical response
  Audiences polled by CinemaScore gave the film an average grade of "A" on an A+ to F scale.

Chris Evangelista of /Film called it "...one of Spielberg's warmest, funniest films" and highlighted Kamiński's cinematography. Steve Pond of TheWrap wrote "The film shows a light touch that doesn't detract from the very real depths that are being explored. That The Fabelmans is one of Steven Spielberg's most personal movies was never in doubt; that it's also one of his most original and most satisfying in years is a welcome bonus." Pete Hammond of Deadline Hollywood praised the performances of Williams, Dano, LaBelle and Butters, calling the former "gut-wrenchingly great," while saying that Dano was "terrific as the genuinely nice and loving father torn between following his own career and caring for his wife and family under increasingly difficult circumstances." He described LaBelle's performance as "sensational throughout, a young man with a love for movies, but tortured by growing pains and a family drifting apart." He also referred to David Lynch's cameo as being "worth the price of admission alone."

Ross Bonaime of Collider wrote "For decades, Spielberg has shown us ourselves through the magic of his movies, and with The Fabelmans, he finally shows us who he is, the good and the bad, and pain and the joys, the magic and the mayhem." Peter Debruge of Variety named it the frontrunner for the Academy Award for Best Picture, while writing "...this endearing, broadly appealing account of how Spielberg was smitten by the medium – and why the prodigy nearly abandoned picture-making before his career even started – holds the keys to so much of the master's filmography. More similar to Woody Allen's autobiographical Radio Days than it is to European art films such as The 400 Blows and Amarcord (the more highbrow models other directors typically point to when re-creating their childhoods), The Fabelmans invites audiences into the home and headspace of the world's most beloved living director, an oddly sanitized zone where even the trauma – which includes anti-Semitism, financial disadvantage and divorce – seems to go better with fresh-buttered popcorn."

David Ehrlich of IndieWire was mixed about the film and gave it a B+, writing that Spielberg "...may not have been able to fix his parents' marriage, but for more than half a century his films have been reconciling the family that Arthur and Leah Spielberg made possible. 'The Fabelmans' doesn't do that as well as the director's best work, but it dramatizes his process of making peace with his dreams so beautifully that it almost doesn't matter. To me, this is a far cry from a magnum opus. For Spielberg, it feels like the greatest show on Earth." Brian Tallerico of RogerEbert.com praised the screenplay, calling it "...a graceful gem, moving through different chapters of the life of this relatively average family that would just happen to produce an unaverage filmmaker." Benjamin Lee of The Guardian was mixed, saying that "There remains a remove though still, Spielberg giving us a slightly too stage-managed version of himself and his family, some gristle missing from the darkest moments." Tomris Laffly of The Playlist wrote "It's Spielberg's most personal film, one that gorgeously revives the memories of his childhood and youth with a lavish sense of wistfulness and an aptly Hollywood-ized, fable-like touch."

John DeFore of The Hollywood Reporter called it "...a vivid capturing of the auteur's earliest flashes of filmmaking insight and a portrait, full of love yet unclouded by nostalgia, of the family that made him." Justin Chang of Los Angeles Times called it "A uniquely confessional work, in which a great artist freely and happily acknowledges the manipulation inherent in the art form he was born to master." Leah Greenblatt of Entertainment Weekly wrote that "If it all feels a little sanitized and idealized, it's also consistently lovely – and after 75 years and 34 films, who more than Spielberg has earned the right to revisit his stardust memories?" Richard Lawson of Vanity Fair wrote that "Not all memoir is generous. It can be intriguingly solipsistic, or maddeningly vain. But because there's always been a curious blankness to Spielberg's public persona – cheerful and engaged but never quite known – The Fabelmans does feel like something of a gift."

David Fear of Rolling Stone wrote that "If the movie does adhere to [Steven Spielberg's] signature beats, and feature so many recognizable Spielbergisms, occasionally to its detriment, it's still one of the most impressive, enlightening, vital things he's ever done." Peter Travers of ABC News was positively overwhelmed by the film, saying "Bring out the Oscars for 'The Fabelmans,' a personal best from Steven Spielberg in no small part because it's a family picture about Spielberg's own family. Sentimental? Sure. Sappy? Never. No movie this year cuts a clearer path to the heart and the power of imagination." Anthony Lane of The New Yorker praised the film, saying "'The Fabelmans' may look nice 'n' easy as it swings along, with a pile of laughs to cushion the ride, and a nifty visual gag in the closing seconds, but take care. Here is a film that is touched with the madness of love."

Anna Swanson of Film School Rejects praised the film, saying "By laying bare indiscretions and frustrations, Spielberg is ostensibly airing out the dirty laundry and then treating it with the empathy that can only come from an adult perspective on childhood memories. As they're depicted in the film, Burt and Mitzi are far more nuanced and complicated than any kid believes their parents to be when they're young. It's a touching, mature gesture that ultimately flatters all involved." Kyle Buchanan of The New York Times praised Michelle Williams' performance, writing that she "...really goes for it, attacking this part like someone who knows she's been handed her signature role." In a later review for the paper, Manohla Dargis named it a New York Times Critic's Pick, calling the film "...somewhat of a fable and wonderful in both large and small ways, even if Spielberg can't help but soften the rougher, potentially lacerating edges."

Alison Willmore of Vulture wrote that "Spielberg, an incredibly precise filmmaker, never seems certain as to what a movie about his life, or about that of a slightly outsize proxy, should look like, and that uncertainty is actually the warmest and most vulnerable quality The Fabelmans has." Johnny Oleksinski of New York Post praised the film, calling it "...gripping, visually mesmeric, boasts an exceptional, grounded script by Tony Kushner and is acted to the hilt. A no-holds-barred Michelle Williams skyrockets to the front of the Oscar race with an unforgettable performance." Todd Gilchrist of The A.V. Club praised the film, calling it "A measured and incredibly intimate look at Spielberg's upbringing as he developed his aptitude for storytelling through a medium that mesmerized him... as an extraordinary device that not only unveils powerful truths, but often shapes them as well." David Sims of The Atlantic singled out LaBelle, Williams and Dano's performances and praised Spielberg's use of storytelling, saying that "Viewers expecting a stirring childhood memoir about the power of cinema may be surprised at how bittersweet and raw the story actually is. But that vulnerability is what makes the film a triumph." Joyce Carol Oates, the author of the Marilyn Monroe biography Blonde, which was adapted into a film in 2022, slammed the film as "remarkably mediocre" and that it "discourages young filmmakers," criticizing every element of the plot, performances and screenplay, saying "By making a blonde-Aryan-antisemite the pseudo hero of his high school movie the young Fabelman disarms enemies & wins a pseudo friend. Is this an acknowledgment of the superficial triteness of the director’s career as an entertainer?" She did however praise the scene with David Lynch. Her comments received online backlash for showing disrespect to Spielberg's work and to viewers who felt connected to the film.

Stephanie Zacharek of Time ranked the film as the best movie of 2022. Zacharek would furthermore praise Williams and Dano's performances as part of Time's Top 10 movie performances of 2022, describing Williams as "a portrait of a woman so full of life she doesn't know where to put it all…Williams captures Mitzi's all-encompassing incandescence and her isolation," and Dano "In him we see the sum of all the things that so many men of that generation just didn't know how to be; we also see a deep well of love, no less real for being left unexpressed." Filmmaker Denis Villeneuve also praised the film, calling it "...the best movie ever made about the power of cinema. It’s a miracle. To say that I was deeply moved by this movie is an understatement. The Fabelmans is a pure act of artistic generosity made by one of the greatest filmmakers of our time." Indian filmmaker S. S. Rajamouli also lauded the film, expressing how he was able to relate to the portrayal of the Fabelman family in the film by saying "Luckily for me, I keep my whole family in the film business, my wife, my son, my brother, my brother’s wife – everyone is with me making movies, so I don’t miss my family."

Adam Nayman of The Ringer named the frame of younger Sammy Fabelman (Mateo Zoryan Francis-DeFord) "projecting his own painstakingly captured Super 8 footage onto his outstretched palms" in the dark as one of the best shots of 2022, calling it "...a holy trinity that, as visualized by Steven Spielberg at his late-career image-making peak, signifies something deeply metaphysical about filmgoing and filmmaking — that the artist must imagine himself amidst the audience." Pete Volk of Polygon named the "hallway scene" where Logan Hall confronts Sammy Fabelman over the way the latter portrayed him in the "Ditch Day" film and the two of them ultimately coming to an understanding, as one of the best movie scenes of 2022, calling it "...a powerful moment in a movie filled with them, and it gets right to the heart of Spielberg’s story of the undeniable power of images and the responsibility of those who wield them."

Upon the film's release in France, it received a 4.9 average from critics on AlloCiné from 42 reviews, with all but 6 giving the film 5 stars, making it become the highest-rated film of the 21st century in the country. Cahiers du Cinéma wrote that Spielberg, at age 76, had "come to represent like no other, the idea of cinema as wonder, at a time when the relationship to the spectacular and the cinema seems more tormented than ever" and declared that the film will "undoubtedly remain the most important and singular film of his career."

Accolades

The Fabelmans received seven nominations at the 95th Academy Awards, including Best Picture, but failed to win any due to it receiving a divided reception by the Academy and strong competition from Everything Everywhere All at Once, which won the award. It also received five nominations at the 80th Golden Globe Awards, winning Best Motion Picture – Drama and Best Director for Spielberg, and received 11 nominations at the 28th Critics' Choice Awards, including Best Picture, winning Best Young Performer for LaBelle, and two nominations at the 29th Screen Actors Guild Awards including Best Ensemble Cast of a Motion Picture and Best Supporting Actor (for Dano). It also received 2 awards from the National Board of Review, including Best Director for Spielberg and Breakthrough Performance for LaBelle (shared with Danielle Deadwyler for Till), making this the second Spielberg film to win both of these awards together since 1987's Empire of the Sun. With his 53rd nomination for Best Original Score with this film, John Williams broke his own record as the most Oscar-nominated person alive at the age of 90. With his Oscar nomination for Best Supporting Actor, Judd Hirsch became the first actor to receive two nominations over four decades apart, with this being his second nomination and first since the 53rd Academy Awards in 1981, where he was nominated for Ordinary People (1980). It is also the first TIFF People's Choice Award winner to not win any of its Oscar nominations since David Cronenberg's Eastern Promises (2007) and Spielberg's first film to not win any since Ready Player One (2018).

Future
When asked about whether he would consider making a sequel to the film, Spielberg told W Magazine: "I never say never, but I don’t know what to do next. I was so emotionally invested in The Fabelmans, I left a vast body of water between myself and the next project. I didn’t plan ahead at all. I haven’t found my passion. And I can’t work without passion. I won't." During the conversation with S. S. Rajamouli, Spielberg said that he will not rule out the possibility of a sequel, but confirmed that there are currently no immediate plans.

See also
 Spielberg, a 2017 HBO documentary film about Spielberg's life, most of which inspired the plot for this film.

References

External links
 
 The Fabelmans at Universal Pictures
 The Fabelmans at Amblin website
 
 Official screenplay

2022 drama films
2020s American films
2020s coming-of-age drama films
2020s English-language films
Amblin Entertainment films
American coming-of-age drama films
American films based on actual events
Autobiographical films
Best Drama Picture Golden Globe winners
Drama films based on actual events
Films about antisemitism
Films about children
Films about divorce
Films about dysfunctional families
Films about father–son relationships
Films about filmmaking
Films about friendship
Films about Jews and Judaism
Films about mother–son relationships
Films about school bullying
Films about siblings
Films about tornadoes
Films directed by Steven Spielberg
Films impacted by the COVID-19 pandemic
Films produced by Steven Spielberg
Films scored by John Williams
Films set in Arizona
Films set in Los Angeles
Films set in New Jersey
Films set in the 1950s
Films set in 1952
Films set in 1953
Films set in 1957
Films set in the 1960s
Films set in 1962
Films set in 1963
Films set in 1964
Films set in 1965
Films shot in Los Angeles
Films whose director won the Best Director Golden Globe
Films with screenplays by Steven Spielberg
Films with screenplays by Tony Kushner
Reliance Entertainment films
Toronto International Film Festival People's Choice Award winners
Universal Pictures films